The Lecce trolleybus system forms part of the public transport network of the city and comune of Lecce, in the Apulia region, southern Italy.

Opened in January 2012, the system comprises three routes, of which one is a circular (loop) route with different route numbers for the two directions. The last of the three routes opened in June 2014.

History
The network was made possible thanks to state funding authorised by the law 211 of 26 February 1992 (Interventions in the field of mass rapid transport systems).

The first of 12 Van Hool trolleybuses on order was delivered on 30 March 2007, and the first overhead wiring was installed during the same month.  The operator, SGM Lecce, ceremonially 'opened' the network in the presence of the then-mayor, Adriana Poli Bortone, and ran an inaugural tour.  However, a series of bureaucratic problems delayed the actual completion of the system and its opening for service. Delivery of additional trolleybuses began around the end of October 2007.

On 31 March 2010, SGM appointed a director of trolleybus operations, a move that facilitated commencement of procedures for driver training. Still, by October 2010 only a few test runs had taken place. 

The system was finally opened on 12 January 2012, but only one route (29) initially.  At the time of the system's opening, four of the twelve vehicles on orderall of which had been completed by the end of 2007were still being stored at the Van Hool factory in Belgium.

On 2 February 2013, the second line was opened, a loop route numbered 31 in the clockwise direction and 30 in the counterclockwise direction, with a headway of 40 minutes. The third route, 27, opened on 15 June 2014, connecting the city centre with Ecotekne. A large loop at the route's outer end is not equipped with overhead wiring, and the trolleybuses cover it using their diesel engines.

Trolleybuses do not operate on any route on Sundays.

In June 2022, the routes were renumbered, with route 27 becoming S13, route 29 becoming M1, and circular 30/31 (counterclockwise/clockwise) becoming C3 and C2, respectively.

Lines
The Lecce trolleybus lines are as follows:

 M1 (formerly 29): City Terminal (on Via Porta d'Europa) – city centre – Lecce railway station
 C2/C3 (formerly 31/30), named Circolare destra and Circolare sinistra (clockwise circular and counterclockwise circular), with layover point at Porta Napoli
 S13 (ex-27):  City Terminal – Ecotekne-Fiorini

Fleet
The Lecce trolleybus fleet comprises 12 Van Hool A330T 12 m dual-mode rigid buses, built in 2006–2007, each fitted with both electric traction motors and a euro 4 diesel engine.

See also

List of trolleybus systems in Italy

References

Notes

External links
 Trolleybus city: Lecce (Italy) at Trolleymotion (German, with automated translation to English and other languages available on-site) 

Lecce
Lecce
Transport in Apulia
2012 establishments in Italy